Alexander and Mischa Zverev were the defending champions, but Alexander chose not to participate this year. Mischa played alongside Karen Khachanov, but lost in the first round to Ben McLachlan and Hugo Nys.

Ken and Neal Skupski won the title, defeating McLachlan and Nys in the final, 7–6(7–2), 6–4.

Seeds

Draw

Draw

References 
 Main Draw

Open Sud de France
Doubles